French Lick Township is one of ten townships in Orange County, Indiana, United States. As of the 2010 census, its population was 4,699 and it contained 2,263 housing units.

History
French Lick Township was named after French Lick Creek.

Geography

Cities, towns, villages
 French Lick
 West Baden Springs

Unincorporated towns
 Abydel at 
 Prospect at 
 Roland at 
(This list is based on USGS data and may include former settlements.)

Cemeteries
The township contains these three cemeteries: Mount Lebanon, Pythian and Sulphur Creek.

Major highways
  U.S. Route 150
  Indiana State Road 56
  Indiana State Road 145

Airports and landing strips
 French Lick Municipal Airport

School districts
 Springs Valley Community School Corporation

Political districts
 Indiana's 9th congressional district
 State House District 62
 State Senate District 48

References
 
 United States Census Bureau 2008 TIGER/Line Shapefiles
 IndianaMap

External links
 Indiana Township Association
 United Township Association of Indiana
 City-Data.com page for French Lick Township

Townships in Orange County, Indiana
Townships in Indiana